Ilya Haimovich Grubert (born 13 May 1954 in Riga) is a Dutch classical violinist and a professor.

Biography 
Ilya Grubert began his violin studies at the Emīls Dārziņš Music School. He later studied at the Moscow Central Music School and the Moscow Conservatory with Yuri Yankelevich, Zinaida Gilels, and Leonid Kogan. He is a multiple prizewinner of prestigious violin competitions. Earning his first international success by receiving 2nd prize at the Sibelius Competition in 1975, he subsequently won 1st prizes in both Paganini Competition in 1977, and Tchaikovsky Competition in 1978.

Since then Grubert has had a distinguished career and performed with orchestras such as the Moscow Philharmonic, St. Petersburg Philharmonic, the Russian State Orchestra, Dresden Staatskapelle, Rotterdam Philharmonic, and the Netherlands Philharmonic. He has worked with conductors such as Mariss Jansons, Gennady Rozhdestvensky, Voldemar Nelson, Mark Wigglesworth, and Maxim Shostakovich.

Now Grubert lives in the Netherlands and is a professor at the Amsterdam Conservatory and at the University of Minho.

External links 
 Ilya Grubert's official site

1954 births
Living people
Soviet classical violinists
Academic staff of the Conservatorium van Amsterdam
Paganini Competition prize-winners
Soviet emigrants to the Netherlands
Musicians from Riga
Academic staff of the University of Minho
21st-century classical violinists